Spreadex is a British-based company that offers financial spread betting, sports spread betting, and sports fixed-odds betting.

History
Spreadex commenced trading in 1999 in Dunstable, Bedfordshire. It was founded by former City dealer Jonathan Hufford with the intention of making spread betting more accessible. The business relocated to St Albans, Hertfordshire in February 2008.

In May 2006, Spreadex launched an online sports betting service and soon after launched a financial online trading platform. In May 2010, the company launched a fixed odds sports betting service allowing bets to be placed in both fractional and decimal format.

Spreadex was listed in the Sunday Times PriceWaterhouseCoopers Profit Track 100 for three years in succession. In 2006, Spreadex finished 34th; in 2007, they finished 23rd, and in 2008, they finished in 49th place.

In June 2011, Spreadex acquired the client database of extrabet, the sports betting arm of IG Group. This was followed in January 2012 by the purchase of the client database of bankrupt company MF Global Spreads, and by the purchase of the non-equities business of rival spread betting firm Cantor Index in March 2013.

In September 2011, Spreadex introduced an online Casino featuring table, card, slot, video poker, instant win games, and a live dealer service.

Due to an ever-expanding customer base, in September of 2013 Spreadex penned a £1.2m private cloud deal with Computacenter to improve the stability and security of its trading platforms.

In October 2014, to accommodate the firm's growing workforce, Spreadex moved to a larger, newly-refurbished office in St Albans called Churchill House.

Spreadex has won numerous awards since its inception, including Best Spread Betting Provider at the 2016, 2018 and 2020 City of London Wealth Management Awards; Best Mobile Trading Platform and Best Trading Alerts System at the 2020 ADVFN Awards; Best Spread Betting Provider at the 2019 Good Money Guide Awards; and Best Spread Betting Operator at the 2017 and 2020 EGR Awards.

This as well as Best Customer Service in the 2013, 2014, 2015 and 2017 Investment Trends Report. In 2017, Spreadex was also listed by the Financial Times Europe as one of the top 1000 fastest growing companies in the continent.

Operations 
Spreadex has three main products – sports betting, financial trading and casino gaming – and takes a range of bets via desktop, mobile, tablet and telephone.

The sports product offers both sports spread betting and sports fixed odds betting including features such as Bet-Builder, Auto-Cash Out and Live Streaming.

The financial trading product offers financial spread betting, CFDs, Options and ETFs covering indices, shares, forex, commodities, bonds, cryptocurrencies and more.

The casino gaming product includes slots, roulette and blackjack featuring Live Dealers.

Spreadex owns financial spread betting company (www.shortsandlongs.com) which was launched in October 2008. The client database of ShortsandLongs was transferred to Spreadex in March 2012 to consolidate its business.

References

Gambling companies of the United Kingdom
Financial services companies of the United Kingdom
Financial derivative trading companies
Financial services companies established in 1999
British companies established in 1999